Charles of Artois (1394 – 25 July 1472), son of Philip of Artois, Count of Eu, and Marie of Berry, was Count of Eu from 16 June 1397 until his death 75 years later. He was taken prisoner by the English at the Battle of Agincourt on 25 October 1415, and was not released until 1438. In 1448, he married Jeanne of Saveuse (died  1449) and on 23 September 1454, Helene of Melun (d. 1473), but he had no children. He was appointed Lieutenant of the King in Normandy and Guyenne, as well as Governor of Paris, during the War of the Public Weal in 1465. He was succeeded by his nephew John II, Count of Nevers.

References

Sources

1394 births
1472 deaths
Artois, Charles of
Charles
Military governors of Paris
French prisoners of war in the Hundred Years' War